Creasy is a surname. Notable people with the surname include:

Edward Shepherd Creasy (1812–1878), English historian
George Creasy (1895–1972), Royal Navy officer
Gerald Creasy (1897–1983), British colonial administrator
Kenneth Creasy (1932–1992), American politician
Robert Creasy (1939–2005), American computer scientist
Rosalind Creasy (born 1939), American landscape designer and author
Sara Creasy (born 1968),  Australian author
Stella Creasy  (born 1977), British Labour Co-operative politician

Fictional characters
Marcus Creasy in the Man on Fire novel and sequels
John Creasy in the 1987 Man on Fire film
John Creasy in the 2004 Man on Fire film

See also
Creasey (surname) 
Creasy Airport, in unincorporated Galveston County, Texas, United States